✕ (Unicode character ) may be used as:

 An x mark, a mark used to for negation or indication
 A multiplication sign (more exactly), a rotationally symmetric saltire
 The sign for cross product (more exactly), a binary operation on two vectors in three-dimensional space